Interferon regulatory factor 1 is a protein that in humans is encoded by the IRF1 gene.

Function 
Interferon regulatory factor 1 was the first member of the interferon regulatory transcription factor (IRF) family identified. Initially described as a transcription factor able to activate expression of the cytokine Interferon beta, IRF-1 was subsequently shown to function as a transcriptional activator or repressor of a variety of target genes. IRF-1 regulates expression of target genes by binding to an interferon stimulated response element (ISRE) in their promoters. The IRF-1 protein binds to the ISRE via an N-terminal helix-turn-helix DNA binding domain, which is highly conserved among all IRF proteins.

Beyond its function as a transcription factor, IRF-1 has also been shown to trans-activate the tumour suppressor protein p53 through the recruitment of its co-factor p300.

IRF-1 has been shown to play roles in the immune response, regulating apoptosis, DNA damage and tumor suppression.

Regulation 
It has been shown that the extreme C-terminus of IRF-1 regulates its ability to activate transcription, nanobodies targeting this domain (MF1) are able to increase IRF-1 activity.

Model organisms

Model organisms have been used in the study of IRF1 function. A conditional knockout mouse line, called Irf1tm1a(EUCOMM)Wtsi was generated as part of the International Knockout Mouse Consortium program — a high-throughput mutagenesis project to generate and distribute animal models of disease to interested scientists — at the Wellcome Trust Sanger Institute.

Male and female animals underwent a standardized phenotypic screen to determine the effects of deletion. Twenty five tests were carried out and two phenotypes were reported. Homozygous mutant animals had abnormal peripheral blood lymphocytes, specifically decreased CD8-positive T cell and NK cell numbers and an increase in CD4-positive T cells. The mice also had an abnormal integument phenotype determined by a study of tail epidermis.

Interactions 

IRF1 has been shown to interact with:
 CHIP
 GAGE
 HSP70 / HSP90
 IRF8
 KPNA2 
 MYD88
 PCAF
 STAT1
 TAT
 VEGFR2
 REDD2

See also 
IRF2
Interferon regulatory factors

References

Further reading

External links

Transcription factors
Genes mutated in mice